Elizabeth "Liz" Storer is an American politician and a Democratic member of the Wyoming House of Representatives representing the 23rd district since January 10, 2023.

Political career
When incumbent Democratic representative Andy Schwartz announced his retirement, Storer declared her candidacy and won the Democratic primary on August 16, 2022, defeating fellow candidate Ryan Sedgeley with 76% of the vote. She then won the general election on November 8, 2022, defeating Republican nominee Paul Vogelheim with 52% of the vote.

References

External links
Profile from Ballotpedia

Living people
Democratic Party members of the Wyoming House of Representatives
People from Jackson, Wyoming
University of Southern California alumni
21st-century American politicians
Year of birth missing (living people)